Chris Aberdein (born 23 January 1963) is a South African racing driver who competed in the South African Touring Car Championship for Audi in the late 1990s, finishing runner-up in 1996 to teammate Terry Moss, and picking up 7 wins and 12 podiums on the way. Over the course of his career in the sport, Aberdein won almost 10% of races that he entered.

Aberdein's son Jonathan is also a racing driver, who currently competes in the DTM.

References 

Living people
South African racing drivers
1963 births
Place of birth missing (living people)